Helmut Kleebank (born 18 November 1964) is a German teacher and politician of the Social Democratic Party (SPD) who has been serving as member of the Bundestag since 2021.

Political career
Kleebank served as mayor of Spandau from 2011 to 2021.

Kleebank was elected directly to the Bundestag in 2021, representing the Berlin-Spandau – Charlottenburg North district. In parliament, he has been serving on the Committee on Climate Action and Energy and the Committee on the Environment, Nature Conservation, Nuclear Safety and Consumer Protection. He has also been chairing the Parliamentary Advisory Board on Sustainable Development.

Within his parliamentary group, Kleebank belongs to the Parliamentary Left, a left-wing movement.

Other activities
 Nuclear Waste Disposal Fund (KENFO), Member of the Board of Trustees (since 2022)

References 

Living people
1964 births
People from Berlin
Social Democratic Party of Germany politicians
Members of the Bundestag 2021–2025
21st-century German politicians